"Out of My Mind" is a song by American rapper B.o.B from his second studio album Strange Clouds (2012). The song features Nicki Minaj and was produced by Dr. Luke and Billboard. "Out of My Mind" was the fourth single released from the album. The song was primarily written by B.o.B, Nicki Minaj, DJ Frank E, and Alex da Kid.

Reception
"Out of My Mind" was met with generally positive reviews upon release, particularly due to Minaj's verse in the song.  Some compared it to her verse on Kanye West's "Monster" where critics say Minaj "stole the show". Kyle Anderson of EW.com stated, "Out of My Mind is an impressive testament to [B.o.B's] infectious, unflappable cool. The guy knows how to hang in nearly every sonic situation, and master it — just like a real rock star." Anderson named "Out of My Mind" as one of the best tracks on the album, along with "So Hard to Breathe". According to the Universal Music Group, the song was written in 2009.

Andrew Unterberger gave the song a "3 star" rating, criticizing B.o.B, by saying, "Really, it was never a fair fight. B.o.B. seems like a very nice young man, but intimidatingly deranged he is not, and his verses (featuring couplets like 'I was doing fine / Until my brain left and it didn't say bye' and 'I am a rebel but yes I'm so militant / Still I'm eligible for disabilities') are as convincing of his insanity as a 12-year-old telling an obviously fraudulent story of the action he got last summer at overnight camp." Unterberger also complimented Nicki Minaj's verse.

Music video
The music video was directed by Benny Boom and was filmed in Detroit the week of July 16, 2012. A behind-the-scenes video was released on August 13. On August 10, B.o.B himself confirmed via Twitter that he would release the music video on August 15, but it failed to meet its premiere date. It is set in a mental hospital. In one scene, B.o.B is handcuffed to a wheelchair. In another, he is struggling in a strait jacket and a Hannibal Lecter-type mask. Minaj is also seen rapping alongside B.o.B. Minaj is referenced as "Dr. Minaj" for a brief moment in the video, just as her verse begins. The video made its full premiere on August 23, 2012 on BET's 106 & Park and shortly after, uploaded to B.o.B's official YouTube account. Fans have noted that the song's lyrics and Minaj's role in the video are reminiscent of DC Comics supervillain Harley Quinn's origin story.

Live performances
Minaj performed her verse in a medley on her Pink Friday: Reloaded Tour.

Chart performance

References

2012 singles
B.o.B songs
Grand Hustle Records singles
Song recordings produced by Billboard (record producer)
Song recordings produced by Dr. Luke
Songs written by B.o.B
Songs written by Dr. Luke
Songs written by Nicki Minaj
Nicki Minaj songs
Music videos directed by Benny Boom
Atlantic Records singles
Songs written by Kinetics (rapper)
Songs written by One Love (record producer)
Songs written by Billboard (record producer)
2012 songs